Adam Theodore Calhoun is an American rapper, singer, songwriter, and comedian.  He is active as a social media personality and has released a number of albums. His most successful album was a collaboration with Tom MacDonald, titled The Brave, released in 2022. The same year, he released another album named Country Rap Tunes.

Music career
Calhoun started his music career performing with country rap singer, Hosier.  They released a single "Salute the Brave" in 2017, which reached No. 46 on Hot Country Songs. and they also released an album Made in America that year.  He ended his collaboration with Hosier and started a solo career in 2018, and released AmerAcal. Later in the year he released his second album The Throne.  A track in the album "Racism" drew criticism for using the  N-word and stereotypes about white and black people. In a collaboration with Country rap singer Upchurch with the song "Back N Forth", Calhoun complains about men wearing women's dresses.

He released an EP Crazy White Boy with Demun Jones. During their "Crazy White Boy Tour", their shows in Sacramento, California were scheduled in the same weekend as the Sacramento Pride, which led to protests because of his social media posts on gay and trans people and song lyrics described as "racist". It resulted in those shows being cancelled. Other shows similarly faced protests and another show in Oklahoma City was canceled.

On July 18, 2019, Calhoun released his third solo album, War.  The album was the second best-selling country album and the third best-selling rap album of the week, with 3,200 copies sold.

Calhoun has also collaborated with a number of other artists, including Upchurch on Hooligan released in 2019, and Struggle Jennings on Legend, released in 2020.

In 2022, Calhoun collaborated with Tom MacDonald to release an album, The Brave. The album was the best selling album the week of its release in March 2022, with 16,000 copies sold in the U.S.

Personal life
Calhoun has a son, Tamen Calhoun by a former girlfriend. He has a daughter, Grae Millie born September 2021, with his wife Margie. 

Calhoun served time in prison for punching an on-duty police officer.

Calhoun has a YouTube channel with over 1.3 million subscribers as of August 2022, where he often expresses his political and social views, including his support for former president Trump.

Adam has also expressed his intent  to run for President, as of December 20th, 2020.

Discography

Albums

Extended plays

Singles

References

External links
  YouTube channel
  website

1980 births
American country singer-songwriters
American male rappers
Country rap musicians
Living people
21st-century American male singers
21st-century American singers
Country musicians from Illinois
Comedians from Illinois
American male singer-songwriters
American nationalists 
Right-wing politics in the United States
Critics of Black Lives Matter
Male critics of feminism
Singer-songwriters from Illinois